The 2014–15 Northwestern Wildcats women's basketball team will represent Northwestern University during the 2014–15 NCAA Division I women's basketball season. The Wildcats, led by seventh year head coach Joe McKeown, play their home games at the Welsh-Ryan Arena and were a members of the Big Ten Conference. They finished the season 23–9, 12–6 in Big Ten play to finish in a tie for fourth place. They advanced to the semifinals of the Big Ten women's tournament where they lost to Maryland. They received at-large bid to the NCAA women's basketball tournament, which was their first trip since 1997. They lost in the first round to Arkansas.

2014–15 Roster

Schedule

|-
!colspan=9 style="background:#431F81; color:#FFFFFF;"| Exhibition

|-
!colspan=9 style="background:#431F81; color:#FFFFFF;"| Non-conference regular season

|-
!colspan=9 style="background:#431F81; color:#FFFFFF;"| Big Ten regular season

|-
!colspan=9 style="background:#431F81;"|Big Ten Women's Tournament

|-
!colspan=9 style="background:#431F81;"| NCAA Women's Tournament

Rankings

See also
2014–15 Northwestern Wildcats men's basketball team

References

Northwestern Wildcats women's basketball seasons
Northwestern
Northwestern
Northwestern Wild
Northwestern Wild